Josef Schreiner was a German cross-country skier who competed in the 1930s. He won a silver medal in the 4 x 10 km at the 1934 FIS Nordic World Ski Championships in Sollefteå.

External links
World Championship results 

German male cross-country skiers
Possibly living people
FIS Nordic World Ski Championships medalists in cross-country skiing
Year of birth missing